Soledad.com is a 2016 Peruvian science fiction thriller film directed and co-produced by Antonio Landeo, Ítalo Lorenzzi and Martín Landeo, with a script written by Antonio Landeo. Starring Julián Legaspi and Antonio Arrué.

Synopsis 
In the computer system of the National Systems Institute, a hacker mafia has inserted a virus, the Trojan. Ángel (Julián Legaspi), a professor of New Technologies discovers the fact and trying to solve the problem, he realizes that the World Wide Web is about to collapse. All the data on the Network could disappear. There is only one possibility to eliminate that threat: Entering the NETWORK. Together with Ximena, the model and host Clelia Francesconi, a diligent student, and Alejandro (Alexis Villagra), owner of Vilsol, a leading Information Security company, who have the necessary knowledge to disable the Trojan, they immerse themselves in the virtual world.

Cast 
The actors participating in this film are:

 Julián Legaspi as Ángel
 Clelia Francesconi as Ximena
 Marcelo Rivera as Miguel
 Alexis Villagra as Alejandro
 Carlos Barraza as Hacker
 Julio Andrade as Alejandro
 Antonio Arrué
 Enrique Victoria

Release 
It was commercially released on May 12, 2016, in Peruvian theaters.

References 

2016 films
2016 thriller films
2016 independent films
Peruvian science fiction films
Peruvian thriller films
2010s Spanish-language films
2010s Peruvian films
Films set in Peru
Films shot in Peru
Films about security and surveillance
Films about technology